Oil Springs may refer to:

Canada 
Oil Springs, Ontario

United States 
Oil Springs, Kentucky
Oil Springs Reservation, an Indian reservation of the Seneca tribe in New York state